The Ambassador of the United Kingdom to Guinea is the United Kingdom's foremost diplomatic representative in the Republic of Guinea, and head of the UK's diplomatic mission in Conakry.

The Republic of Guinea (formerly known as French Guinea) declared its independence from France on 2 October 1958, and the then UK ambassador to Liberia, Guy Clarke, was also accredited to Guinea in 1959 until the first resident ambassador arrived in 1960. In 1965 the mission was briefly combined with Mali before a break in diplomatic relations; when relations were resumed in 1970 the mission was combined with Senegal until 2000 and with Sierra Leone until 2003.

List of heads of mission

Ambassadors
1959–1960: Guy Clarke (non-resident)
1960–1962: Donald Logan
1962–1965: Hilary William King
1965: John Waterfield (non-resident)
1965–1970: Diplomatic relations severed over Rhodesia
1970–1971: John Tahourdin (non-resident)
1971–1973: Ivor Porter (non-resident)
1973–1976: Denzil Dunnett (non-resident)
1976–1979: John Powell-Jones (non-resident)
1979–1982: William Squire (non-resident)
1982–1985: Laurence O'Keeffe (non-resident)
1985–1990: John Macrae (non-resident)
1990–1993: Roger Beetham (non-resident)
1993–1997: Alan Furness (non-resident)
1997–2000: David Snoxell (non-resident)
2000–2003: Alan Jones (non-resident)
2003–2004: Helen Horn
2004–2008: John McManus
2008–2011: Ian Felton
2011–2015: Graham Styles
2015: Ian Richards (diplomat) (chargé d'affaires)
2015-2019 Catherine Inglehearn

2019–: David McIlroy

References

External links
British Embassy Conakry

Guinea
 
United Kingdom